Šandrovac is a village and municipality in Bjelovar-Bilogora County, Croatia. There are 2,095 inhabitants, which 84% are Croats.

In 2008, the municipality unveiled a monument to the Croatian victims of World War II.

References

Municipalities of Croatia
Populated places in Bjelovar-Bilogora County